Adam Spjuth, better known by his stage name Imaa Queen (born December 26, 1993), is a Swedish drag queen and entertainer.

Career and recognition 
In 2022, he was the winner of the title. Imaa Queen also won the international drag artist competition The EuroStars Drag Contest in 2021, the template of Eurodrag.

Adam Spjuth was one of the producers of the 2020-2021 Lights Event 08., the show concept "C'est La Vie Stockholm" and "C'est la Vie Sundays" which was performed on the legendary  in Stockholm. "C'est La Vie" was a variety cabaret that adapted to covid-19 pandemic restrictions and allowed performers to entertain smaller audiences.

Imaa Queen is participating in the first season of Drag Race Sweden.

References 

1993 births
Living people
Drag Race Sverige
Swedish drag queens